Mitoguazone (also known as methylglyoxal bis(guanylhydrazone) or MGBG) is a drug used in chemotherapy.

References 

Guanidines
Antineoplastic drugs